Oskaloosa is an unincorporated community in Clay County, Illinois, United States. Oskaloosa is west of Louisville.

References

Unincorporated communities in Clay County, Illinois
Unincorporated communities in Illinois